Francis Edward Clarke was an Irish Anglican clergyman.

Matthews was ordained deacon on 13 September 1613; and priest on 26 February 1614. He held the Vicarages of Tawnagh and Aghanagh was collated Archdeacon of Elphin on 10 October 1615 and served throughout 1616 and 1617.

References 

Irish Anglicans
Archdeacons of Elphin